The 2016 Icelandic Cup, also known as Borgunarbikar for sponsorship reasons, was the 57th edition of the Icelandic national football cup.

Calendar
Below are the dates for each round as given by the official schedule:

First round

|colspan="3" style="background-color:#97DEFF"|27 April 2016

|-
|colspan="3" style="background-color:#97DEFF"|29 April 2016

|-
|colspan="3" style="background-color:#97DEFF"|30 April 2016

|-
|colspan="3" style="background-color:#97DEFF"|1 May 2016

|-
|colspan="3" style="background-color:#97DEFF"|3 May 2016

|}

Second round

|colspan="3" style="background-color:#97DEFF"|1 May 2016

|-
|colspan="3" style="background-color:#97DEFF"|7 May 2016

|-
|colspan="3" style="background-color:#97DEFF"|9 May 2016

|-
|colspan="3" style="background-color:#97DEFF"|10 May 2016

|-
|colspan="3" style="background-color:#97DEFF"|11 May 2016

|}

Round of 32

|colspan="3" style="background-color:#97DEFF"|24 May 2016

|-
|colspan="3" style="background-color:#97DEFF"|25 May 2016

|-
|colspan="3" style="background-color:#97DEFF"|25 May 2016

|}

Round of 16

|colspan="3" style="background-color:#97DEFF"|8 June 2016

|-
|colspan="3" style="background-color:#97DEFF"|9 June 2016

|}

Quarter-finals

|colspan="3" style="background-color:#97DEFF"|3 July 2016

|-
|colspan="3" style="background-color:#97DEFF"|4 July 2016

|-
|colspan="3" style="background-color:#97DEFF"|5 July 2016

|}

Semi-finals

|colspan="3" style="background-color:#97DEFF"|27 July 2016

|-
|colspan="3" style="background-color:#97DEFF"|28 July 2016

|}

Final

|colspan="3" style="background-color:#97DEFF"|13 August 2016

|-
|}

Top goalscorers

7 goals
  Karel Sigurðsson (Berserkir)

4 goals

  Atli Sigurðsson (KH)
  Orri Freyr Hjaltalín (Magni)
  Jóhann Örn Sigurjónsson (Magni)
  Aron Grétar Jafetsson (KFG)

3 goals

  Kristinn Þór Rósbergsson (Magni)
  Einar Guðnason (Berserkir)
  Baldur Jónsson (KFG)
  Bjarni Pálmason (KFG)
  Kristinn Justiniano Snjólfsson (UMF Sindri Höfn)
  Fufura (Haukar)
  Kolbeinn Kárason (Leiknir Reykjavík)

External links

2016 in Icelandic football
2016 domestic association football cups
Icelandic Men's Football Cup